Maxim Petrovich Pokidov (born 11 July 1989 in Lipetsk) is a Russian former professional cyclist.

Major results

2006
 1st  Points race, UEC European Junior Track Championships
2011
 3rd Time trial, National Under-23 Road Championships
2012
 1st Stage 3 (TTT) Circuit des Ardennes
2013
 1st  Criterium, National Road Championships
 1st Stage 2 Five Rings of Moscow
 1st Stage 1 Tour Alsace
 2nd Mayor Cup
 3rd Grand Prix of Donetsk
 4th Overall Grand Prix of Adygeya
1st Points classification
 9th Grand Prix of Moscow
2014
 1st Points classification Tour Alsace
 4th Duo Normand (with Maxim Razumov)
 5th Overall Baltic Chain Tour
 7th Overall Okolo Jižních Čech
 7th Central European Tour Szerencs–Ibrány
 9th Overall Czech Cycling Tour
2015
 1st  Team time trial, National Road Championships (with Anton Samokhvalov, Kirill Yegorov and Dimitry Samokhvalov)
 1st Stage 1 (TTT) Grand Prix of Sochi
 3rd Overall Grand Prix of Adygeya
1st Stage 1 (TTT)
 9th Overall Tour of Kuban
1st Prologue

References

External links

1989 births
Living people
Russian male cyclists
Sportspeople from Lipetsk
21st-century Russian people